The 1982 Louisville Cardinals football team represented the University of Louisville in the 1982 NCAA Division I-A football season. The Cardinals, led by third-year head coach Bob Weber, participated as independents and played their home games at Cardinal Stadium. This is the first season under this stadium name as prior to 1982 it was known as Fairgrounds Stadium.

Schedule

Roster

References

Louisville
Louisville Cardinals football seasons
Louisville Cardinals football